Pablo Esteban O'Higgins (born Paul Higgins Stevenson; March 1, 1904 - July 16, 1983) was an American-Mexican artist, muralist and illustrator.

Early life and education 
Born in Salt Lake City, Utah, O'Higgins was raised there and in San Diego, California. In 1922 he abandoned his first career as a pianist and entered the Academy of Arts in San Diego. 

Within two years he'd become a student of Diego Rivera, assisting Rivera on his murals at the National School of Agriculture at Chapingo, and the Public Education Secretariat.

Mexico and murals 
Like Rivera, O'Higgins became an active member of the Mexican Communist Party. He immigrated to Mexico permanently in 1924, joined the party in 1927, and maintained his party membership until 1947. His political illustrations for the Daily Worker won him a year's study at the Academy of Art in Moscow on a Soviet Scholarship in 1933.

In 1937, O'Higgins was the co-founder, with fellow artists Leopoldo Méndez and Luis Arenal, of the Taller de Gráfica Popular ("People's Graphic Workshop"). The Taller became inspiration to many politically active leftist artists; for example, American expressionist painter Byron Randall went on to found similar artist collectives after becoming an associate member. In May 1940 O'Higgins had the honor of being the only non-native Mexican artist with work included in the seminal "Twenty Centuries of Mexican Art" exhibit organized by the Museum of Modern Art.

In 1961 O'Higgins was awarded honorary Mexican citizenship for "his contributions to the national arts and education". One of his murals can be seen at the Abelardo L. Rodriguez Market, Mexico City. 

His 1945 mural for the Ship Scalers Union Hall in Seattle is installed in Kane Hall at the University of Washington in Seattle. The mural depicts Seattle's Ship Scalers Union's (SSU) history as a strongly anti-racist, anti-discriminatory, and progressive force in social politics.

Among O'Higgins' students was the American graphic designer Bob Cato, and artist and muralist Marion Greenwood.

Further reading
 Acevedo, Esther. "Young Muralists at the Abelardo L. Rodriguez Market." in Mexican Muralism: A Critical History, Alejandro Anreus, Robin Adèle Greeley, and Leonard Folgarait.  Berkeley and Los Angeles: University of California Press 2012, pp. 125–147.
 Espinosa Campos, Eduardo. "Pablo O'Higgins: arte mural para las escuelas". In La pintura mural en los centros de educación en México. Pinacoteca 2003.é
 Flores, Laura. "Pablo O'Higgins: Pintura y Cambio Social." Metamórphosis, Northwest Chicano Magazine of Art and Literature. IV no. 2, col. V no. 1 (1982/1983).ó
 Fundación Cultural María y Pablo O'Higgins. Pablo O'Higgins, Contruyendo vidas. Mexico City 2005.
 Hijar, Alberto. Pablo O'Higgins: Apuntes y dibujos de trabajadores. Monterrey: Secretaría de Educación y Cultura 1987.
 Poniatowska, Elena and Gilbert Bosques. Pablo O'Higgins. Mexico City: Banco  Nacional de Comercio Exterior 1984.
 UNAM. Pablo O'Higgins: Voz de Lucha y Arte. Mexico City: UNAM-Gobierno del Distrito Federal, Gobierno del Estado de Nuevo León, Fundación Cultural María y Pablo O'Higgins, A.C., 2005.
 Vogel, Susan. Becoming Pablo O'Higgins. San Francisco and Salt Lake City: Pince-Nez Press 2010

References

External links 
Works produced by Pablo O'Higgins at the Taller de Gráfica Popular - Gráfica Mexicana

1904 births
1983 deaths
American communists
American emigrants to Mexico
American muralists
Naturalized citizens of Mexico
Mexican muralists
Mexican communists
Artists from Salt Lake City
Mexican people of Irish descent
San Diego High School alumni